Jetse Bol (born 8 September 1989 in Avenhorn) is a Dutch professional road bicycle racer, who currently rides for UCI ProTeam . As a young boy, Bol was a talented speed skater but later switched to cycling.

Major results

2006
 2nd Time trial, National Junior Road Championships
2007
 3rd Overall Driedaagse van Axel
2008
 8th Paris–Roubaix Espoirs
2009
 1st  Overall Olympia's Tour
1st Prologue (TTT)
 4th Overall Boucles de la Mayenne
2010
 1st  Overall Le Triptyque des Monts et Châteaux
1st Stage 2a (ITT)
 5th Overall Tour de Normandie
1st Stage 1 (ITT)
 5th Paris–Roubaix Espoirs
 6th Kampioenschap van Vlaanderen
 8th Overall Tour de Bretagne
1st Stage 1
2011
 1st  Overall Olympia's Tour
1st Stages 1 & 6
 2nd Omloop der Kempen
 3rd Kernen Omloop Echt-Susteren
 4th Overall Tour de Bretagne
1st Stages 1 & 3
 5th Ster van Zwolle
 6th Overall Ronde van Drenthe
 6th Châteauroux Classic
 7th Paris–Roubaix Espoirs
2012
 10th Grand Prix Impanis-Van Petegem
2013
 7th Binche–Chimay–Binche
 10th Overall Tour de l'Eurométropole
2015
 1st  Overall Olympia's Tour
1st Stage 2
2016
 10th Ronde van Limburg
2017
 6th Prueba Villafranca de Ordizia
 7th Overall Circuit de la Sarthe
 10th Overall Vuelta a Burgos
2018
  Combativity award Stage 18 Vuelta a España
2019
 4th Prueba Villafranca de Ordizia
 6th Circuito de Getxo
2020
 6th Prueba Villafranca de Ordizia
  Combativity award Stage 1 Vuelta a España
2021
  Combativity award Stage 16 Vuelta a España
2022
  Combativity award Stages 2 & 11 Vuelta a España

Grand Tour general classification results timeline

References

External links

1989 births
Living people
Dutch male cyclists
People from Koggenland
UCI Road World Championships cyclists for the Netherlands
Cyclists from North Holland